Árni Sigurðsson (born 18 April 1941) is an Icelandic former alpine skier. He competed in two events at the 1964 Winter Olympics.

References

External links
 

1941 births
Living people
Arni Sigurdsson
Arni Sigurdsson
Alpine skiers at the 1964 Winter Olympics
Arni Sigurdsson
20th-century Icelandic people